South Carolina Highway 16 (SC 16) is a  primary state highway in the U.S. state of South Carolina that exists mostly within Columbia in Richland County. Its routing is in a backward C-shape.

Route description
SC 16 begins at an intersection with SC 48, just south of the University of South Carolina. Going in a counterclockwise direction, it goes east to U.S. Routes 76 and 378 (US 76/US 378) at Devine Street, then north intersecting SC 12 (Forest Drive) within the small portion of Forest Acres through which SC 16 travels, and US 1 (Two Notch Road). Heading now west, it intersects SC 555 (Farrow Road) before splitting into one-way streets: northbound along Marshall Street and southbound along Sunset Drive and Academy Street. SC 16 recombines onto Sunset Drive at the SC 277 (Northeastern Freeway) northbound on-ramps, flanked by the Palmetto Health Richland.

Shaped as a backward C, it travels along the following street names: Rosewood Drive, Beltline Boulevard, Marshall Street/Academy Street, and Sunset Drive.  Signage along the entire route is poorly marked with few signs indicating it is SC 16 and several major intersections not clearly marked.

History

Established in 1964, it existed twice as two unrelated highways before in 1927-1931 and 1939-1948.  The first SC 16 was an original state route from SC 2 (today US 176) in Columbia, north into North Carolina, continuing as NC 16; it connected the cities and towns of Ridgeway, Winnsboro, Chester, York, and Clover.  In 1927, US 21 was assigned between Columbia and Chester; the following year SC 16 was removed from that section.  In 1931, the first SC 16 was decommissioned when US 321 was assigned on the remaining route.

The second SC 16 appeared in 1939 as a new primary routing between SC 48 east to US 76 in Columbia. In 1940, it was extended north from US 76 to SC 12. In 1948, the second SC 16 was decommissioned, downgraded to secondary roads.

The third and current SC 16 eventually resurrects part of its previous route.  Reappearing in 1964, as a new primary routing, it traversed from its current northern terminus at US 176 east to US 76/US 378/SC 760. In 1982, SC 16 was extended west to its current southern terminus at SC 48; this left behind Cross Hill Road and its connection to SC 760.

Junction list

See also

References

External links

 
 SC 16 at Virginia Highways' South Carolina Highways Annex

016
Transportation in Columbia, South Carolina